Niels Moeller Lund (Born, Faaborg, Denmark, 1863 - Died, London, 1916) was a Danish artist. He grew up in Newcastle-upon-Tyne and studied at the Académie Julian in Paris. He is known for his impressionistic paintings of England, particularly London and the North-East. His most well known painting - The Heart Of The Empire - hangs in the Guildhall Art Gallery. It provided inspiration for Frederic Marlett Bell-Smith's painting of the same name, which also depicted Threadneedle Street.

Works
Attack on the Japanese Battery at Shimonoseki, National Museum of the Royal Navy, Portsmouth
After Rain, Shipley Art Gallery
A Winter's Night, Laing Art Gallery
Corfe Castle, Dorset, Laing Art Gallery
Mid the Wild Music of the Glen, Laing Art Gallery
Newcastle upon Tyne from Gateshead, Laing Art Gallery
Newcastle upon Tyne from the East, Laing Art Gallery
The Heart of the Empire, Guildhall Art Gallery
John Cooke Esq, Derry City Council
Joseph Cooke, Derry City Council

References

External links

1863 births
1916 deaths
Danish artists
People from Faaborg-Midtfyn Municipality